Suzie Wong can refer to:

 The World of Suzie Wong, a 1957 novel by Richard Mason
 Suzie Wong (franchise), a media franchise originating from the novel
 The World of Suzie Wong (film), the 1960 film adaptation of the novel
 Suzie Wong (Digimon), also known as Shuichon Li or Li Xiaochun, a character in Digimon Tamers
 "Suzie Wong", a song by Jacob Miller
 Suzie Wong (TV host) (born 1955), a Hong Kong TV host adopting this pseudonym
 Suzie Wong (orca), a killer whale at Ocean Park Hong Kong between 1979 and 1997

See also
 Wong (disambiguation)
 Suzie (disambiguation)
 Suzi (disambiguation)
 Suzy (disambiguation)